When I Come Back To You (We'll Have A Yankee-Doodle Wedding) is a World War I song written and composed by William Tracey and Jack Stern. The song was first published in 1918 by Douglas & Newman Music in New York, NY.The sheet music cover depicts a soldier hugging a woman with the Liberty Bell in the background.

The sheet music can be found at the Pritzker Military Museum & Library.

References 

Bibliography
Parker, Bernard S. World War I Sheet Music Vol 2. Jefferson: McFarland & Company, Inc., 2007. . 
Vogel, Frederick G. World War I Songs: A History and Dictionary of Popular American Patriotic Tunes, with Over 300 Complete Lyrics. Jefferson: McFarland & Company, Inc., 1995. . 

Songs about marriage
1918 songs
Songs of World War I